Santosh Kumar Srivastava from the California Institute of Technology, was awarded the status of Fellow in the American Physical Society, after they were nominated by their Division of Atomic, Molecular & Optical Physics in 1994, for contributions made to the field of electron-atom/molecule collision physics by developing experimental techniques to measure accurate collision cross sections and by generating a large body of cross section data for elastic and inelastic scattering, ionization and attachment.

References 

Fellows of the American Physical Society
American physicists
Living people
Year of birth missing (living people)